Shadows of the Past may refer to:

 Shadows of the Past (album), an album by Sentenced
 Shadows of the Past (1922 film), a 1922 German silent film
 Shadows of the Past (1936 film), a 1936 Austrian drama film
 Shadows of the Past (1991 film), a 1991 Canadian suspense thriller TV film 
 Shadows of the Past (telenovela) (La sombra del pasado), a Mexican telenovela